Duke of Segorbe is an hereditary title in the peerage of Spain, accompanied by the dignity of Grandee and granted in 1469 by John II of Aragon to Enrique de Aragón, son of Infante Henry, Duke of Villena and Beatriz de Pimentel, from whom the ducal house of Medinaceli descends.

Current Duke of Segorbe 
Ignacio Medina y Fernández de Córdoba succeeded in 1969 as 19th Duke of Segorbe before marrying Princess Maria da Glória de Orléans-Braganza in 1985.
The Duke and Duchess of Segorbe have two daughters:
 Sol María de la Blanca Medina y Orléans-Braganza, 54th Countess of Ampurias (b. 1986), heiress apparent to her father's titles;
 Ana Luna Medina y Orléans-Braganza, 17th Countess of Ricla (b. 1988).

Succession 
As with other Spanish noble titles, the dukedom of Segorbe descended according to cognatic primogeniture, meaning that females could inherit the title if they had no brothers (or if their brothers had no issue). That changed in 2006, since when the eldest child (regardless of gender) can automatically succeed to noble family titles.

List of titleholders

See also 

 Cardinal Fernández de Córdoba
 Casa de Medinaceli
 Grandees of Spain

References

External links 
 Elenco de Grandezas y Títulos Nobiliarios Españoles. Instituto "Salazar y Castro", C.S.I.C.
 www.fundacionmedinaceli.org

Dukedoms of Spain
Lists of dukes
Segorbe